Donorovyn Lümbengarav born 27 January 1977, is a Mongolian footballer who plays as a defender. He was a member of the Mongolia national football team, and first represented them in 2000, retiring in 2014. He is the current top scorer and most capped player for the national team.

International goals 
Scores and results list Mongolia's goal tally first.

References

Living people
1977 births
Mongolian footballers
Mongolia international footballers
Erchim players
Khoromkhon players
Place of birth missing (living people)
Association football defenders